Methodist Episcopal Church South is a historic former church in Roseburg, Oregon. It was completed in 1922 and was added to the National Register of Historic Places in 1985.

It is a stuccoed, cast concrete building.  Its interior features stained glass windows by the Povey Brothers, three of them large, some of them damaged in 1959.  In 1959, "a chemical truck explosion leveled eight blocks of the city and extensively damaged many buildings in the city."  Only one of the large windows was in its original condition, as of 1974.

References

Methodist churches in Oregon
Churches on the National Register of Historic Places in Oregon
Churches completed in 1922
Buildings and structures in Roseburg, Oregon
National Register of Historic Places in Douglas County, Oregon
1922 establishments in Oregon